Diederik Gommers (born 1964) is a Dutch Intensive Care physician. He works at the Erasmus MC in Rotterdam and is chairman of the Dutch Union for Intensive Care.

COVID-19 pandemic 
During the COVID-19 pandemic in the Netherlands, Gommers has been part of the Outbreak Management Team that instructs the government of Mark Rutte on measures required to reduce the spread of the disease Covid-19. He is also responsible for informing the Tweede Kamer on the current state of Intensive Care units in the Netherlands during the crisis.

References 

Dutch intensivists
1964 births
Living people